The 1986 Mid-American Conference men's basketball tournament was held March 6-8 at the Rockford MetroCentre in Rockford, Illinois. Third seeded Ball State defeated top-seeded  in the championship game by  the score of 87–79 to win their second MAC men's basketball tournament and a bid to the NCAA tournament. Dan Palombizio Ball State was named the tournament MVP.

Format
Seven of the ten MAC teams participated.  All games were played at the Rockford MetroCentre in Rockford, Illinois.

Bracket

References

Mid-American Conference men's basketball tournament
Tournament
MAC men's basketball tournament
MAC men's basketball tournament